Roberto González Díaz-Durán (born 15 November 1970) is a Guatemalan economist and politician who served as Minister of Energy and Mines from 2004 to 2005. González has been an unsuccessful candidate for mayor of Guatemala City in 2007, 2011 and 2019, he came in second place in all three elections.

González was also presidential candidate in 2015 for the CREO–Unionist coalition, after forming a temporary coalition with his political rival, mayor Álvaro Arzú.

References 

Living people
1970 births
Guatemalan economists
Government ministers of Guatemala
Universidad Francisco Marroquín alumni
21st-century Guatemalan politicians